Fragata is a settlement in the northwestern part of the island of São Nicolau, Cape Verde. In 2010 its population was 172. It is situated 2 km south of Ribeira Prata and 9 km north of Tarrafal de São Nicolau. It consists of the localities Cruzinha, Geronimo, Santa Barbara and Fragatona (Tope).

See also
List of villages and settlements in Cape Verde

References

Villages and settlements in São Nicolau, Cape Verde
Tarrafal de São Nicolau